Catalina Speroni (January 1, 1938 – December 21, 2010) was an Argentine film, stage and television actress whose career spanned more than 40 years.

Her film credits included Felicidades, Cómpices, Tatuado and El despertar de L. Her television credits included roles on Campeones de la Vida, Calabromas and La familia Benvenuto.

Death
Speroni died on December 21, 2010, at the age of 72 after an illness. She was buried at the cemetery in the Chacarita neighborhood of Buenos Aires.

References

External links

1938 births
2010 deaths
Argentine film actresses
Argentine stage actresses
Argentine television actresses
Actresses from Buenos Aires
20th-century American actresses
21st-century Argentine actresses
21st-century American women